The Melbourne Press Club, commonly referred to as MPC, is a not-for-profit association of journalists in the city of Melbourne, Australia.

The Melbourne Press Club provides awards in the State of Victoria for outstanding journalism, presenting the annual Quill Awards for Excellence in Victorian journalism. MPC co-hosts the annual Graham Perkin Australian Journalist of the Year Award, named after a celebrated Australian journalist. MPC also presents the annual Grant Hattam Award, in honour of the leading media lawyer who died suddenly in 1998 from cancer. It also hosts The Australian Media Hall of Fame which honours "journalists, editors, publishers, broadcasters, producers, artists, photographers or others who have had a significant impact by working in the media".

The MPC often holds lunches for the press to meet with high-profile political leaders, business leaders and figures relevant to significant public issues. The Journalism 2007 Conference was sponsored by MPC in 2007, and in 2007, Prime Minister John Howard made an address to the MPC regarding Australia's Climate Change Policy.

References

External sources 
MPC Official site
The Australian Media Hall of Fame

Organisations based in Melbourne
Mass media in Australia
Press clubs
Clubs and societies in Australia